American singer, rapper and songwriter DEV has recorded material for two studio album, three extended plays, and has been featured on several songs on other artists' respective albums. She has also recorded successful songs that have been released as non-album promotional singles, some of which have been released freely on the web.

List

Dev